Racing suit is a special clothing worn by racing drivers during races.

Racing suit may also refer to:
 Competitive swimwear
 NASCAR racing suit
 Nomex suit
 Motorcycle leathers
 Tracksuit